Sinocyclocheilus longibarbatus is a species of ray-finned fish in the genus Sinocyclocheilus.

References 

longibarbatus
Fish described in 1989